BEM or Bem may refer to:

Acronyms
 Baptism, Eucharist and Ministry (the Lima-Document of 1982)
 Black and ethnic minority, persons or groups
 "Block, element, modifier", a Cascading Style Sheets authoring methodology
 Board of Engineers Malaysia
 Borneo Evangelical Mission, a Christian missionary organisation
 Boundary element method, a numerical analysis method using computation
 Brevet état-major, a military diploma in France and Belgium
 British Empire Medal, a British medal awarded for meritorious civil or military service
 Brotherhood of Evil Mutants, an organization in the fictional X-Men universe
 Bug-eyed monster, a stock character in science fiction
 Bangkok Expressway and Metro Public Company Limited, a Thai transportation operator

People

People with the given name Bem
 Bem Le Hunte (born 1964), author who has published internationally

People with the surname Bem
 Daryl Bem (born 1938), social psychologist at Cornell University
 Józef Bem (1794–1850), Polish general and a national hero of Poland and Hungary
 Pavel Bém (born 1963), Czech politician
 Sandra Bem (1944–2014), Pennsylvanian psychologist known for many of her works in androgyny
 Elisabeth Boehm or Elisaveta Merkuryevna Bem (1843–1914), Russian painter

People with the nickname or pen name Bem
 Bernie Mireault (born 1961), who uses the pen name Bem, a French-Canadian comic book artist and writer

Art, entertainment, and media
 BEM (originally called Bemusing Magazine), a British comics fanzine published by Martin Lock from 1973 to 1982
 "Bem" (Star Trek: The Animated Series), a 1974 episode of the animated television series Star Trek
 Rev Bem, a character in Andromeda TV series
 Humanoid Monster Bem, a 1968-1969 anime re-made in 2006 and 2019

Places
 Bem, Missouri, a community in the United States

See also
 BME (disambiguation)